Archermus was a sculptor of Chios working in the middle of the 6th century BC. His father, Micciades, and his sons, Bupalus and Athenis, were sculptors of marble.

A scholium on Aristophanes' Birds, credits Archermus with having been the first to represent Nike and Eros with wings.  A running archaic Nike figure that was found at Delos in 1877 (Tarbell), was at first too hopefully connected with a separate base found nearby, which recorded the execution of a statue by Archermus and Micciades; at first it was  dubbed the "Nike of Archermus". Unfortunately it is the base, which probably supported a sphinx, that alone is by Archermus and his father. 

The Museum of Classical Archaeology, Cambridge, classify their cast of the Nike as:

Notes

References
Tarbell, F. B. A History Of Greek Art. Chapter V, fig. 85 (the Nike "of Archermus").

Attribution

6th-century BC Greek sculptors
Ancient Greek sculptors
Ancient Chians